Patu is a genus of dwarf orb-weavers that was first described by Brian John Marples in 1951. Two candidates for the "smallest species of spider", are in this genus, Patu digua and Patu marplesi.

Species
 it contains eighteen species, found in Asia, Oceania, on the Seychelles, and in Colombia:
Patu catba S. Q. Li & Lin, 2021 – Vietnam
Patu dakou S. Q. Li & Lin, 2021 – China
Patu damtao S. Q. Li & Lin, 2021 – Vietnam
Patu digua Forster & Platnick, 1977 – Colombia
Patu eberhardi Forster & Platnick, 1977 – Colombia
Patu jiangzhou S. Q. Li & Lin, 2021 – China
Patu jidanweishi Miller, Griswold & Yin, 2009 – China
Patu marplesi Forster, 1959 – Samoa
Patu nagarat S. Q. Li & Lin, 2021 – Thailand
Patu nigeri Lin & Li, 2009 – China
Patu putao S. Q. Li & Lin, 2021 – Myanmar
Patu qiqi Miller, Griswold & Yin, 2009 – China
Patu saladito Forster & Platnick, 1977 – Colombia
Patu samoensis Marples, 1951 – Samoa
Patu silho Saaristo, 1996 – Seychelles
Patu vitiensis Marples, 1951 (type) – Fiji
Patu woodwardi Forster, 1959 – New Guinea
Patu xiaoxiao Miller, Griswold & Yin, 2009 – China

See also
 List of Symphytognathidae species

References

Araneomorphae genera
Spiders of Oceania
Spiders of South America
Symphytognathidae
Taxa named by Brian John Marples